The Bethany Reservoir is located  northeast of Livermore, California, USA, on the California Aqueduct. It serves as the forebay for the South Bay Pumping Plant that feeds the South Bay Aqueduct.

Characteristics
 Gross capacity:

See also
 List of dams and reservoirs in California
 List of lakes in California

References

External links
 Bethany Reservoir

Reservoirs in Alameda County, California
California State Water Project
Reservoirs in California
Reservoirs in Northern California